Medieval Islamic astronomy comprises the astronomical developments made in the Islamic world, particularly during the Islamic Golden Age (9th–13th centuries), and mostly written in the Arabic language. These developments mostly took place in the Middle East, Central Asia, Al-Andalus, and North Africa, and later in the Far East and India. It closely parallels the genesis of other Islamic sciences in its assimilation of foreign material and the amalgamation of the disparate elements of that material to create a science with Islamic characteristics. These included Greek, Sassanid, and Indian works in particular, which were translated and built upon.

Islamic astronomy played a significant role in the revival of Byzantine and European astronomy following the loss of knowledge during the early medieval period, notably with the production of Latin translations of Arabic works  during the 12th century. Islamic astronomy also had an influence on Chinese astronomy.

A significant number of stars in the sky, such as Aldebaran, Altair and Deneb, and astronomical terms such as alidade, azimuth, and nadir, are still referred to by their Arabic names.  A large corpus of literature from Islamic astronomy remains today, numbering approximately 10,000 manuscripts scattered throughout the world, many of which have not been read or catalogued. Even so, a reasonably accurate picture of Islamic activity in the field of astronomy can be reconstructed.

History

Pre-Islamic Arabs 

The Islamic historian Ahmad Dallal notes that, unlike the Babylonians, Greeks, and Indians, who had developed elaborate systems of mathematical astronomical study, the pre-Islamic Arabs relied upon empirical observations.

Early period
The first astronomical texts that were translated into Arabic were of Indian  and Persian origin. The most notable was Zij al-Sindhind, a zij produced by Muḥammad ibn Ibrāhīm al-Fazārī and Yaʿqūb ibn Ṭāriq, who  translated an 8th century Indian astronomical work after 770, with the assistance of Indian astronomers who were at the court of caliph Al-Mansur.  was also based upon Indian astronomical tables, compiled in the Sasanian Empire over a period of two centuries. Fragments of texts during this period show that Arab astronomers adopted the sine function from India in place of the chords of arc used in Greek trigonometry.

The rise of Islam, with its obligation to determine the five daily prayer times and the qibla (the direction towards the Kaaba in the Sacred Mosque in Mecca) inspired intellectual progress in astronomy.

Astronomical methods 
The philosopher Al-Farabi (d. 950) described astronomy in terms of mathematics, music, and optics. He showed how astronomy could be used to describe the Earth's motion, and the position and movement of celestial bodies, and separated mathematical astronomy from science, restricting astronomy to describing the position, shape, and size of distant objects. Al-Farabi used the writings of Ptolemy, as described in his Analemma, a way of calculating the Sun's position from any fixed location.

Golden Age

The House of Wisdom was an academy established in Baghdad under Abbasid caliph Al-Ma'mun in the early 9th century. Astronomical research was greatly supported by al-Mamun through the House of Wisdom.

The first major Muslim work of astronomy was Zij al-Sindhind, produced by the mathematician Muhammad ibn Musa al-Khwarizmi in 830.  It contained tables for the movements of the Sun, the Moon, and the planets Mercury, Venus, Mars, Jupiter and Saturn. The work introduced Ptolemaic concepts into Islamic science, and marked a turning point in Islamic astronomy, which had previously concentrated on translating works, but which now began to develop new ideas.

Doubts on Ptolemy 

In 850, the Abbasid astronomer Al-Farghani wrote  ("A compendium of the science of stars"). The book gave a summary of Ptolemic cosmography. However, it also corrected Ptolemy based on the findings of earlier Arab astronomers. Al-Farghani gave revised values for the obliquity of the ecliptic, the precession of the apogees of the Sun and the Moon, and the circumference of the Earth. The book was circulated through the Muslim world, and translated into Latin.

By the 10th century, texts had appeared that doubted that Ptolemy's works were correct. Islamic scholars questioned the Earth's apparent immobility, and position at the centre of the universe. now that independent investigations into the Ptolemaic system were possible.

The 10th century Egyptian astronomer Ibn Yunus found errors in Ptolemy's calculations. Ptolemy calculated that the Earth's angle of axial precession varied by one degree every 100 years. Ibn Yunus calculated the rate of change to be one degree every 70 years.

Between 1025 and 1028, the polymath Ibn al-Haytham wrote his  ("Doubts on Ptolemy"). While not disputing the existence of the geocentric model, he criticized elements of the Ptolemy's theories. Other astronomers took up the challenge posed in this work, and went on to develop alternate models that resolved the difficulties identified by Ibn al-Haytham. The anonymous work  ("Recapitulation regarding Ptolemy"), produced in Al-Andalus, included a list of objections to Ptolemic astronomy.

Nasir al-Din al-Tusi also exposed problems present in Ptolemy's work. In 1261, he published his , which contained 16 fundamental problems he found with Ptolemaic astronomy, and by doing this, set off a chain of Islamic scholars that would attempt to solve these problems. Scholars such as Qutb al-Din al-Shirazi, Ibn al-Shatir, and Shams al-Din al-Khafri all worked to produce new models for solving Tusi's 16 Problems, and the models they worked to create would become widely adopted by astronomers for use in their own works. 

Nasir al-Din Tusi wanted to use the concept of Tusi couple to replace the "equant" concept in Ptolemic model. Since the equant concept would result in the moon distance to change dramatically through each month, at least by the factor of two if the math is done. But with the Tusi couple, the moon would just rotate around Earth resulting in the correct observation and applied concept. Mu'ayyad al-Din al-Urdi was another engineer/scholar that tried to make sense of the motion of planets. He came up with the concept of lemma, which is a way of representing the epicyclical motion of planets without using Ptolemic method. Lemma was intended to replace the concept of equant as well.

Earth rotation 

Abu Rayhan Biruni (b. 973) discussed the possibility of whether the Earth rotated about its own axis and around the Sun, but in his Masudic Canon, he set forth the principles that the Earth is at the center of the universe and that it has no motion of its own. He was aware that if the Earth rotated on its axis, this would be consistent with his astronomical parameters, but he considered this a problem of natural philosophy rather than mathematics.

His contemporary, Abu Sa'id al-Sijzi, accepted that the Earth rotates around its axis. Al-Biruni described an astrolabe invented by Sijzi based on the idea that the earth rotates.

The fact that some people did believe that the earth is moving on its own axis is further confirmed by an Arabic reference work from the 13th century which states:According to the geometers [or engineers] (muhandisīn), the earth is in a constant circular motion, and what appears to be the motion of the heavens is actually due to the motion of the earth and not the stars.

At the Maragha and Samarkand observatories, the Earth's rotation was discussed by Najm al-Din al-Qazwini al-Katibi (d. 1277), Tusi (b. 1201) and Qushji (b. 1403). The arguments and evidence used by Tusi and Qushji resemble those used by Copernicus to support the Earth's motion. However, it remains a fact that the Maragha school never made the big leap to heliocentrism.

Alternative geocentric systems 

In the 12th century, non-heliocentric alternatives to the Ptolemaic system were developed by some Islamic astronomers in al-Andalus, following a tradition established by Ibn Bajjah, Ibn Tufail, and Ibn Rushd.

A notable example is Nur ad-Din al-Bitruji, who considered the Ptolemaic model mathematical, and not physical. Al-Bitruji proposed a theory on planetary motion in which he wished to avoid both epicycles and eccentrics. He was unsuccessful in replacing Ptolemy's planetary model, as the numerical predictions of the planetary positions in his configuration were less accurate than those of the Ptolemaic model. One original aspects of al-Bitruji's system is his proposal of a physical cause of celestial motions. He contradicts the Aristotelian idea that there is a specific kind of dynamics for each world, applying instead the same dynamics to the sublunar and the celestial worlds.

Later period 

In the late 13th century, Nasir al-Din al-Tusi created the Tusi couple, as pictured above. Other notable astronomers from the later medieval period include Mu'ayyad al-Din al-Urdi (c. 1266), Qutb al-Din al-Shirazi (c. 1311), Sadr al-Sharia al-Bukhari (c. 1347), Ibn al-Shatir (c. 1375), and Ali Qushji (c. 1474).

In the 15th century, the Timurid ruler Ulugh Beg of Samarkand established his court as a center of patronage for astronomy.  He studied it in his youth, and in 1420 ordered the construction of Ulugh Beg Observatory, which produced a new set of astronomical tables, as well as contributing to other scientific and mathematical advances.

Several major astronomical works were produced in the early 16th century, including ones by Al-Birjandi (d. 1525 or 1526) and Shams al-Din al-Khafri (fl. 1525). However, the vast majority of works written in this and later periods in the history of Islamic sciences are yet to be studied.

Influences

Africa
Islamic astronomy influenced Malian astronomy.

Europe 

Several works of Islamic astronomy were translated to Latin starting from the 12th century.

The work of al-Battani (d. 929), Kitāb az-Zīj ("Book of Astronomical Tables"), was frequently cited by European astronomers and received several reprints, including one with annotations by Regiomontanus. Copernicus, in his book that initiated the Copernican Revolution, the De Revolutionibus Orbium Coelestium, mentioned al-Battani no fewer than 23 times, and also mentions him in the Commentariolus. Tycho Brahe, Riccioli, Kepler, Galileo and others frequently cited him or his observations. His data is still used in geophysics.

Around 1190, Al-Bitruji published an alternative geocentric system to Ptolemy's model. His system spread through most of Europe during the 13th century, with debates and refutations of his ideas continued to the 16th century. In 1217, Michael Scot finished a Latin translation of al-Bitruji's Book of Cosmology (Kitāb al-Hayʾah), which became a valid alternative to Ptolemy's Almagest in scholastic circles. Several European writers, including Albertus Magnus and Roger Bacon, explained it in detail and compared it with Ptolemy's. Copernicus cited his system in the De revolutionibus while discussing theories of the order of the inferior planets.

Some historians maintain that the thought of the Maragheh observatory, in particular the mathematical devices known as the Urdi lemma and the Tusi couple, influenced Renaissance-era European astronomy and thus Copernicus. 
Copernicus used such devices in the same planetary models as found in Arabic sources. 
Furthermore, the exact replacement of the equant by two epicycles used by Copernicus in the Commentariolus was found in an earlier work by Ibn al-Shatir (d. c. 1375) of Damascus. Copernicus' lunar and Mercury models are also identical to Ibn al-Shatir's.

While the influence of the criticism of Ptolemy by Averroes on Renaissance thought is clear and explicit, the claim of direct influence of the Maragha school, postulated by Otto E. Neugebauer in 1957, remains an open question. Since the Tusi couple was used by Copernicus in his reformulation of mathematical astronomy, there is a growing consensus that he became aware of this idea in some way.  It has been suggested that the idea of the Tusi couple may have arrived in Europe leaving few manuscript traces, since it could have occurred without the translation of any Arabic text into Latin. One possible route of transmission may have been through Byzantine science, which translated some of al-Tusi's works from Arabic into Byzantine Greek. Several Byzantine Greek manuscripts containing the Tusi-couple are still extant in Italy. Other scholars have argued that Copernicus could well have developed these ideas independently of the late Islamic tradition. Copernicus explicitly references several astronomers of the "Islamic Golden Age" (10th to 12th centuries) in De Revolutionibus: Albategnius (Al-Battani), Averroes (Ibn Rushd), Thebit (Thabit Ibn Qurra), Arzachel (Al-Zarqali), and Alpetragius (Al-Bitruji), but he does not show awareness of the existence of any of the later astronomers of the Maragha school.

It has been argued that Copernicus could have independently discovered the Tusi couple or took the idea from Proclus's Commentary on the First Book of Euclid, which Copernicus cited. 
Another possible source for Copernicus's knowledge of this mathematical device is the Questiones de Spera of Nicole Oresme, who described how a reciprocating linear motion of a celestial body could be produced by a combination of circular motions similar to those proposed by al-Tusi.

China

Islamic influence on Chinese astronomy was first recorded during the Song dynasty when a Hui Muslim astronomer named Ma Yize introduced the concept of seven days in a week and made other contributions.

Islamic astronomers were brought to China in order to work on calendar making and astronomy during the Mongol Empire and the succeeding Yuan dynasty. The Chinese scholar Yeh-lu Chu'tsai accompanied Genghis Khan to Persia in 1210 and studied their calendar for use in the Mongol Empire. Kublai Khan brought Iranians to Beijing to construct an observatory and an institution for astronomical studies.

Several Chinese astronomers worked at the Maragheh observatory, founded by Nasir al-Din al-Tusi in 1259 under the patronage of Hulagu Khan in Persia. One of these Chinese astronomers was Fu Mengchi, or Fu Mezhai. In 1267, the Persian astronomer Jamal ad-Din, who previously worked at Maragha observatory, presented Kublai Khan with seven Persian astronomical instruments, including a terrestrial globe and an armillary sphere, as well as an astronomical almanac, which was later known in China as the Wannian Li ("Ten Thousand Year Calendar" or "Eternal Calendar"). He was known as "Zhamaluding" in China, where, in 1271, he was appointed by Khan as the first director of the Islamic observatory in Beijing, known as the Islamic Astronomical Bureau, which operated alongside the Chinese Astronomical Bureau for four centuries. Islamic astronomy gained a good reputation in China for its theory of planetary latitudes, which did not exist in Chinese astronomy at the time, and for its accurate prediction of eclipses.

Some of the astronomical instruments constructed by the famous Chinese astronomer Guo Shoujing shortly afterwards resemble the style of instrumentation built at Maragheh. In particular, the "simplified instrument" (jianyi) and the large gnomon at the Gaocheng Astronomical Observatory show traces of Islamic influence. While formulating the Shoushili calendar in 1281, Shoujing's work in spherical trigonometry may have also been partially influenced by Islamic mathematics, which was largely accepted at Kublai's court. These possible influences include a pseudo-geometrical method for converting between equatorial and ecliptic coordinates, the systematic use of decimals in the underlying parameters, and the application of cubic interpolation in the calculation of the irregularity in the planetary motions.

Hongwu Emperor (r. 1368–1398) of the Ming dynasty (1328–1398), in the first year of his reign (1368), conscripted Han and non-Han astrology specialists from the astronomical institutions in Beijing of the former Mongolian Yuan to Nanjing to become officials of the newly established national observatory.

That year, the Ming government summoned for the first time the astronomical officials to come south from the upper capital of Yuan. There were fourteen of them. In order to enhance accuracy in methods of observation and computation, Hongwu Emperor reinforced the adoption of parallel calendar systems, the Han and the Hui. In the following years, the Ming Court appointed several Hui astrologers to hold high positions in the Imperial Observatory. They wrote many books on Islamic astronomy and also manufactured astronomical equipment based on the Islamic system.

The translation of two important works into Chinese was completed in 1383: Zij (1366) and al-Madkhal fi Sina'at Ahkam al-Nujum, Introduction to Astrology (1004).

In 1384, a Chinese astrolabe was made for observing stars based on the instructions for making multi-purposed Islamic equipment. In 1385, the apparatus was installed on a hill in northern Nanjing.

Around 1384, during the Ming dynasty, Hongwu Emperor ordered the Chinese translation and compilation of Islamic astronomical tables, a task that was carried out by the scholars Mashayihei, a Muslim astronomer, and Wu Bozong, a Chinese scholar-official. These tables came to be known as the Huihui Lifa (Muslim System of Calendrical Astronomy), which was published in China a number of times until the early 18th century, though the Qing dynasty had officially abandoned the tradition of Chinese-Islamic astronomy in 1659. The Muslim astronomer Yang Guangxian was known for his attacks on the Jesuit's astronomical sciences.

Korea
In the early Joseon period, the Islamic calendar served as a basis for calendar reform being more accurate than the existing Chinese-based calendars. A Korean translation of the Huihui Lifa, a text combining Chinese astronomy with Islamic astronomy works of Jamal ad-Din, was studied in Korea under the Joseon dynasty during the time of Sejong in the 15th century.

Observatories

The first systematic observations in Islam are reported to have taken place under the patronage of al-Mamun. Here, and in many other private observatories from Damascus to Baghdad, meridian degree measurement were performed (al-Ma'mun's arc measurement), solar parameters were established, and detailed observations of the Sun, Moon, and planets were undertaken.

During the 10th century, the Buwayhid dynasty encouraged the undertaking of extensive works in astronomy; such as the construction of a large-scale instruments with which observations were made in the year 950. This is known through recordings made in the zij of astronomers such as Ibn al-A'lam. The great astronomer Abd al-Rahman al-Sufi was patronised by prince 'Adud al-Dawla, who systematically revised Ptolemy's catalogue of stars. Sharaf al-Dawla also established a similar observatory in Baghdad. Reports by Ibn Yunus and al-Zarqali in Toledo and Cordoba indicate the use of sophisticated instruments for their time.

It was Malik Shah I who established the first large observatory, probably in Isfahan. It was here where Omar Khayyám with many other collaborators constructed a zij and formulated the Persian Solar Calendar a.k.a. the jalali calendar. A modern version of this calendar, the Solar Hijri calendar, is still in official use in Iran and Afghanistan today.

The most influential observatory was however founded by Hulegu Khan during the 13th century. Here, Nasir al-Din al-Tusi supervised its technical construction at Maragha. The facility contained resting quarters for Hulagu Khan, as well as a library and mosque. Some of the top astronomers of the day gathered there, and from their collaboration resulted important modifications to the Ptolemaic system over a period of 50 years.

In 1420, prince Ulugh Beg, himself an astronomer and mathematician, founded another large observatory in Samarkand, the remains of which were excavated in 1908 by Russian teams.

And finally, Taqi al-Din Muhammad ibn Ma'ruf founded a large observatory in Ottoman Constantinople in 1577, which was on the same scale as those in Maragha and Samarkand. The observatory was short-lived however, as opponents of the observatory and prognostication from the heavens prevailed and the observatory was destroyed in 1580. While the Ottoman clergy did not object to the science of astronomy, the observatory was primarily being used for astrology, which they did oppose, and successfully sought its destruction.

As observatory development continued, Islamicate scientists began to pioneer the planetarium. The major difference between a planetarium and an observatory is how the universe is projected. In an observatory, you must look up into the night sky, on the other hand, planetariums allow for universes planets and stars to project at eye-level in a room. Scientist Ibn Firnas, created a planetarium in his home that included artificial storm noises and was completely made of glass. Being the first of its kind, it very similar to what we see  for planetariums today.

Instruments

Our knowledge of the instruments used by Muslim astronomers primarily comes from two sources: first the remaining instruments in private and museum collections today, and second the treatises and manuscripts preserved from the Middle Ages.
Muslim astronomers of the "Golden Period" made many improvements to instruments already in use before their time, such as adding new scales or details.

Celestial globes and armillary spheres

Celestial globes were used primarily for solving problems in celestial astronomy. Today, 126 such instruments remain worldwide, the oldest from the 11th century. The altitude of the Sun, or the Right Ascension and Declination of stars could be calculated with these by inputting the location of the observer on the  meridian ring of the globe. The initial blueprint for a portable celestial globe to measure celestial coordinates came from Spanish Muslim astronomer Jabir ibn Aflah (d. 1145). Another skillful Muslim astronomer working on celestial globes was Abd al-Rahman al-Sufi (b. 903), whose treatise the Book of Fixed Stars describes how to design the constellation images on the globe, as well as how to use the celestial globe. However, it was in Iraq in the 10th century that astronomer Al-Battani was working on celestial globes to record celestial data. This was different because up until then, the traditional use for a celestial globe was as an observational instrument. Al-Battani's treatise describes in detail the plotting coordinates for 1,022 stars, as well as how the stars should be marked. An armillary sphere had similar applications. No early Islamic armillary spheres survive, but several treatises on "the instrument with the rings" were written. In this context there is also an Islamic development, the spherical astrolabe, of which only one complete instrument, from the 14th century, has survived.

Astrolabes

Brass astrolabes were an invention of Late Antiquity. The first Islamic astronomer reported as having built an astrolabe is Muhammad al-Fazari (late 8th century).  Astrolabes were popular in the Islamic world during the "Golden Age", chiefly as an aid to finding the qibla. The earliest known example is dated to 927/8 (AH 315).

The device was incredibly useful, and sometime during the 10th century it was brought to Europe from the Muslim world, where it inspired Latin scholars to take up a vested interest in both math and astronomy. Despite how much we know much about the tool, many of the functions of the device have become lost to history. Although it is true that there are many surviving instruction manuals, historians have come to the conclusion that there are more functions of specialized astrolabes that we do not know of. One example of this is an astrolabe created by Nasir al-Din al-Tusi in Aleppo in the year 1328/29 C.E. This particular astrolabe was special and is hailed by historians as the "most sophisticated astrolabe ever made", being known to have five distinct universal uses.

The largest function of the astrolabe is it serves as a portable model of space that can calculate the approximate location of any heavenly body found within the solar system at any point in time, provided the latitude of the observer is accounted for. In order to adjust for latitude, astrolabes often had a second plate on top of the first, which the user could swap out to account for their correct latitude. One of the most useful features of the device is that the projection created allows users to calculate and solve mathematical problems graphically which could otherwise be done only by using complex spherical trigonometry, allowing for earlier access to great mathematical feats. In addition to this, use of the astrolabe allowed for ships at sea to calculate their position given that the device is fixed upon a star with a known altitude. Standard astrolabes performed poorly on the ocean, as bumpy waters and aggressive winds made use difficult, so a new iteration of the device, known as a Mariner's astrolabe, was developed to counteract the difficult conditions of the sea.

The instruments were used to read the time of the Sun rising and fixed stars. al-Zarqali of Andalusia constructed one such instrument in which, unlike its predecessors, did not depend on the latitude of the observer, and could be used anywhere. This instrument became known in Europe as the Saphea.

The astrolabe was arguably the most important instrument created and used for astronomical purposes in the medieval period. Its invention in early medieval times required immense study and much trial and error in order to find the right method of which to construct it to where it would work efficiently and consistently, and its invention led to several mathematic advances which came from the problems that arose from using the instrument. The astrolabe's original purpose was to allow one to find the altitudes of the sun and many visible stars, during the day and night, respectively. However, they have ultimately come to provide great contribution to the progress of mapping the globe, thus resulting in further exploration of the sea, which then resulted in a series of positive events that allowed the world we know today to come to be. The astrolabe has served many purposes over time, and it has shown to be quite a key factor from medieval times to the present.

The astrolabe required the use of mathematics, and the development of the instrument incorporated azimuth circles, which opened a series of questions on further mathematical dilemmas. Astrolabes served the purpose of finding the altitude of the sun, which also meant that they provided one the ability to find the direction of Muslim prayer (or the direction of Mecca). Aside from these purposes, the astrolabe had a great influence on navigation, specifically in the marine world. This advancement made the calculation of latitude simpler, which led to an increase in sea exploration, and indirectly led to the Renaissance revolution, an increase in global trade activity, and ultimately the discovery of several of the world's continents.

Mechanical calendar
Abu Rayhan Biruni designed an instrument he called "Box of the Moon", which was a mechanical lunisolar calendar, employing a gear train and eight gear-wheels. This was an early example of a fixed-wired knowledge processing machine. This work of Al Biruni uses the same gear trains preserved in a 6th century Byzantine portable sundial.

Sundials

Muslims made several important improvements to the theory and construction of sundials, which they inherited from their Indian and Greek predecessors. Khwarizmi made tables for these instruments which considerably shortened the time needed to make specific calculations.

Sundials were frequently placed on mosques to determine the time of prayer.  One of the most striking examples was built in the 14th century by the muwaqqit (timekeeper) of the Umayyad Mosque in Damascus, ibn al-Shatir.

Quadrants

Several forms of quadrants were invented by Muslims. Among them was the sine quadrant used for astronomical calculations, and various forms of the horary quadrant used to determine the time (especially the times of prayer) by observations of the Sun or stars. A center of the development of quadrants was 9th century Baghdad. Abu Bakr ibn al-Sarah al-Hamawi (d. 1329) was a Syrian astronomer that invented a quadrant called “al-muqantarat al-yusra”. He devoted his time to writing several books on his accomplishments and advancements with quadrants and geometrical problems. His works on quadrants include Treatise on Operations with the Hidden Quadrant and Rare Pearls on Operations with the Circle for Finding Sines. These instruments could measure the altitude between a celestial object and the horizon. However, as Muslim astronomers used them, they began to find other ways to use them. For example, the mural quadrant, for recording the angles of planets and celestial bodies. Or the universal quadrant, for latitude solving astronomical problems. The horary quadrant, for finding the time of day with the sun. The almucantar quadrant, which was developed from the astrolabe.

Equatoria 
Planetary equatoria were probably made by ancient Greeks, although no findings nor descriptions have been preserved from that period. In his comment on Ptolemy's Handy Tables, 4th century mathematician Theon of Alexandria introduced some diagrams to geometrically compute the position of the planets based on Ptolemy's epicyclical theory. The first description of the construction of a solar (as opposed to planetary) equatorium is contained in Proclus's 5th century work Hypotyposis, where he gives instructions on how to construct one in wood or bronze.

The earliest known description of a planetary equatorial is contained in early 11th century treatise by Ibn al-Samh, preserved only as a 13th century Castillian translation contained in the Libros del saber de astronomia (Books of the knowledge of astronomy); the same book contains also a 1080/1081 treatise on the equatorial by Al-Zarqali.

Astronomy in Islamic art 
Examples of cosmological imagery in Islamic art can be found in objects such as manuscripts, astrological tools, and palace frescoes, and the study of the heavens by Islamic astronomers has translated into artistic representations of the universe and astrological concepts. The Islamic world gleaned inspiration from Greek, Iranian, and Indian traditions to represent the stars and the universe.

The desert castle at Qasr Amra, which was used as a Umayyad palace, has a bath dome decorated with the Islamic zodiac and other celestial designs.   The Brethren of Purity described the Sun as being placed at the centre of the universe by God, with the other celestial bodies orbiting around it. 

The Islamic zodiac and astrological visuals can be seen in examples of metalwork. Ewers depicting the twelve zodiac symbols exist in order to emphasize elite craftsmanship and carry blessings such as one example now at the Metropolitan Museum of Art. Coinage also carried zodiac imagery that bears the sole purpose of representing the month in which the coin was minted. As a result, astrological symbols could have been used as both decoration, and a means to communicate symbolic meanings or specific information.

Notable astronomers
Data from Hill (1993), Islamic Science And Engineering'''.

 Jafar al-Sadiq
 Yaqūb ibn Tāriq
 Ibrahim al-Fazari
 Muhammad al-Fazari
 Mashallah ibn Athari
 Naubakht
 Abu Hanifa Dinawari
 Al-Khwarizmi, also a mathematician
 Abu Ma'shar al-Balkhi (Albumasar)
 Al-Farghani
 Banū Mūsā (Ben Mousa)
 Ja'far Muhammad ibn Mūsā ibn Shākir
 Ahmad ibn Mūsā ibn Shākir
 Al-Hasan ibn Mūsā ibn Shākir
 Thābit ibn Qurra (Thebit)
 Sinan ibn Thabit
 Ibrahim ibn Sinan
 Sind ibn Ali
 Al-Majriti
 Al-Battani (Albatenius)
 Al-Farabi (Abunaser)

 Abd Al-Rahman Al Sufi
 Abu Sa'id Gorgani
 Kushyar ibn Labban
 Abū Ja'far al-Khāzin
 Al-Mahani
 Al-Marwazi
 Al-Nayrizi
 Al-Saghani
 Brethren of Purity
 Abū Sahl al-Qūhī (Kuhi)
 Abu-Mahmud al-Khujandi
 Abū al-Wafā' al-Būzjānī
 Ibn Yunus
 Abu Nasr Mansur
 Ibn al-Haytham (Alhacen)
 Al-Biruni
 Avicenna
 Abū Ishāq Ibrāhīm al-Zarqālī (Arzachel)
 Omar Khayyám
 Al-Khazini
 Ibn Bajjah (Avempace)
 Ibn Tufail (Abubacer)

 Nur Ed-Din Al Betrugi (Alpetragius)
 Averroes
 Al-Jazari
 Anvari
 Sharaf al-Dīn al-Tūsī
 Mo'ayyeduddin Urdi
 Nasir al-Din al-Tusi
 Ibn al-Nafis
 Qutb al-Din al-Shirazi
 Ibn al-Shatir
 Shams al-Dīn al-Samarqandī
 Jamshīd al-Kāshī
 Ulugh Beg, also a mathematician
 Ali Qushji, also a mathematician and philosopher
 Al-Birjandi
 Taqi al-Din Muhammad ibn Ma'ruf, Ottoman astronomer
 Ahmad Nahavandi
 Ahmad Khani
 Haly Abenragel
 Abolfadl Harawi

See also
 Astrology in the medieval Islamic world
 History of astronomy

References

Sources 

 
  
 
 
 
 
 
 
 
 
 
 
 
  (PDF version)

Further reading

External links

 Scientific American article on Islamic Astronomy
 The Arab Union for Astronomy and Space Sciences (AUASS)
 King Abdul Aziz Observatory
 History of Islamic Astrolabes 
 Al-Sufi's constellations

Medieval astronomy
Medieval Islamic world
Astronomy